An acoustic torpedo is a torpedo that aims itself by listening for characteristic sounds of its target or by searching for it using sonar (acoustic homing). Acoustic torpedoes are usually designed for medium-range use, and often fired from a submarine.

The first passive acoustic torpedoes were developed nearly simultaneously by the United States Navy and the Germans during World War II. Few of these  torpedoes were actually used and quickly phased out of service in favor of the T4's successor, the G7es T5 Zaunkönig torpedo in August 1943. The T5 first saw widespread use in September 1943 against North Atlantic escort vessels and merchant ships in convoys.

On the Allied side, the US Navy developed the Mark 24 mine, which was actually an aircraft launched, anti-submarine passive acoustic homing torpedo. The first production Mk. 24s were delivered to the U.S. Navy in March 1943, and it scored its first verified combat kills in May 1943. About 204 torpedoes were launched against submarine targets, with 37 Axis submarines being sunk and a further 18 damaged.

Since its introduction, the acoustic torpedo has proven to be an effective weapon against surface ships as well as serving as an anti-submarine weapon. Today, acoustic torpedoes are mostly used against submarines.

Overview
Acoustic homing torpedoes are equipped with a pattern of acoustic transducers on the nose of the weapon.  By a process of phase delaying the signals from these transducers a series of "acoustic beams" (i.e. a variation of acoustic signal sensitivity dependent on the incident angle of the noise energy). In early homing torpedoes the "beam patterns" were fixed whereas in more modern weapons the patterns were modifiable under on-board computer control.  These sensor systems are capable of either detecting sound originating from the target itself i.e. engine and machinery noise, propeller cavitation, etc., known as passive sonar, or responding to noise energy reflections as a result of "illuminating" the target with sonar pulses, known as active sonar. Acoustic torpedoes can be compared to modern fire-and-forget guided missiles. What this means is the enemy (most likely a submarine) will be detected by sonar in any direction it goes. The torpedo will start with passive sonar, simply trying to detect the submarine. Once the torpedo's passive sonar has detected something, it will switch over to an active sonar and will begin to track the target. At this point, the submarine has probably started evasive maneuvers and may have even deployed a noisemaker. The torpedo's logic circuitry, if not fooled by the noise maker, will home in on the noise signature of the target submarine.

Before a torpedo is launched, the target must be "boxed in". A fire control system on the firing platform  will set an initial search depth range which is passed to the weapon's microprocessor. The search parameters cover the expected depth of the target.

Operational use
The initial impact of the acoustic torpedo in the Battle of the Atlantic prior to the widespread deployment of counter-measures cannot be overstated. The German U-boats now had an effective "fire and forget" weapon capable of homing-in on attacking escorts and merchant ships and doing so in close quarters of only three or four hundred yards. By summer of 1943, the German U-boat campaign was experiencing severe setbacks in the face of massive anti-submarine efforts integrating Coastal Command attacks in the Bay of Biscay, the deployment of merchant aircraft carriers in convoys, new anti-submarine technologies such as hedgehog and improved radar, and the use of dedicated hunter-killer escort groups. 

The Allies' improved escorts had greater range, and the use of fuelling at sea added hundreds of miles to the escort groups' radius of action. From June through August, 1943 the number of merchant ships sunk in the Atlantic was almost insignificant, while the number of U-boat kills rose disproportionally and caused a general withdrawal from the Bay of Biscay. For a time, the acoustic torpedo again put the escorts and convoys on the defensive, starting with the attacks in September, 1943 on Convoys ONS 18/ON 202.

Countermeasures

World War 2
The German T5 torpedoes were countered by Allied introduction of the Foxer noise maker. Foxer was the code name for a British built acoustic decoy used to confuse German acoustic homing torpedoes. A US version codenamed FXR was deployed at the end of September 1943 on all transatlantic escort vessels but was soon replaced by the more effective Fanfare noisemaker.

The device consisted of one or two noise-making devices towed several hundred metres astern of the ship. The noise makers mechanically generated a far louder cavitation noise than the ships propellers. This noise distracted the acoustic torpedoes away from the rear of the ship into a circling pattern around the noise maker until the torpedo ran out of fuel. The downside of the Foxer was that it also rendered the ship's own ASDIC ineffective and concealed any other U-boat nearby that could home in on the convoy.

Nevertheless, the FXR countermeasure proved to be highly effective in decoying German acoustic torpedoes. Of the c. 700 fired G7es torpedoes about only 77 had found their aim.

Aside from decoys, British analysts developed a maneuver known as "Step-Aside" in which a ship, upon spotting a U-boat, would trick the U-boat into firing its acoustic torpedo early, and then make a hard turn to put itself out of the torpedo's detection arc, after which it could then bear down on the U-boat to attack.

Postwar
The AN/SLQ-25 Nixie (and AN/SLQ-25A and variants) is a towed decoy deployed on USN and allied surface ships for defending against passive acoustic homing torpedoes. Another, more modern, such system is the AN/SLQ-61 Lightweight Tow (LWT) Torpedo Defense Mission Module (TDMM).

Captured technology

In September 1944, Russian commando frogmen discovered T5 torpedoes aboard the German submarine 		U-250 , which had been sunk in shallow waters by the depth charges of the Soviet submarine chasers Mo 103 and Mo 105 off  Beryozovye Islands. Torpedoes were safely delivered to surface ships. Key components of the G7es T-5 Zaunkönig torpedo were later ordered by Joseph Stalin to be given to British naval specialists.  However, after a protracted journey to Kronstadt the two Royal Navy officers were not allowed access to the submarine and returned home empty handed.

Military examples
United States
RUR-5 ASROC - Ship-launched anti-submarine missile
MK 48 - ADCAP submersion launch torpedo
MK 24 / MK 27 - Passive homing surface / submersible fire torpedo
MK 32  - Active homing surface / submersible / air fire torpedo

References

Bibliography

Cutler, Thomas J. The Battle of Leyte Gulf. New York: Simon and Schuster, 1996
Clancy, Tom. Red Storm Rising. New York: Penguin and Putnam, 1986

ADM 199/2022 analysis of u-boat operations in the vicinity of convoys ONS 18 and ON 202

External links
Report on the interrogation of survivors from U-172 with technical details about German acoustic torpedo (T-5) 

 
German inventions of the Nazi period
German inventions